Leif Gislason (born July 17, 1983) is a Canadian ice dancer. He previously competed with Lauren Flynn, and the pair had some success on the junior level. He then teamed up with Lauren Senft in 2002. The two are the 2004 Canadian junior national silver medalists. Senft & Gislason split after the 2007 Four Continents Championships.

For 2008–2009, Gislason formed a partnership with American Morgan Matthews.

Born in Winnipeg, Manitoba, Canada, Gislason currently lives in Aston, Pennsylvania, where he works at the Ice Works Skating Complex as a coach.

Competitive highlights

With Matthews

With Senft 

 J = Junior level

Programs 
(with Senft)

References

External links
 
 Leif and Lauren's Official Website
 Care to Ice Dance: Senft & Gislason
 Ice Works Homepage

Canadian male ice dancers
1983 births
Living people
Sportspeople from Winnipeg
20th-century Canadian people
21st-century Canadian people